The marine biology dredge is used to sample organisms living on a rocky bottom or burrowing within the smooth muddy floor of the ocean (benthic) species. The dredge is pulled by a boat and operates at any depth on a cable or line, generally with a hydraulic winch. The dredge digs into the ocean floor and bring the animals to the surface where they are caught in a net that either follows behind or is a part of the digging apparatus.

Early dredging samplers did not have  a closing device, and many organisms were washed out. This led to a mistaken impression that the deep-sea bed lacked species diversity, as theorised by Forbes in his Azoic hypothesis. Later samplers devised by Howard L. Sanders and the Epibenthic sled designed by Robert Hessler showed that deep-sea bottoms are sometimes rich in soft-bottom benthic species.

History

The first marine biology dredge was designed by Otto Friedrich Müller and in 1830 the results of two dredging expeditions undertaken by Henri Milne-Edwards and his friend Jean Victoire Audouin during 1826 and 1828 in the neighbourhood of Granville were published. This was remarkable for clearly distinguishing the marine fauna of that portion of the French coast into four zones.

Müller's design was modified by the Dublin naturalist Robert Ball in 1838 and at the Birmingham meeting of the British Association for the Advancement of Science in 1839 a committee was appointed for dredging research with a view to the investigation of the marine zoology of Great Britain, the illustration of the geographical distribution of marine animals, and the more accurate determination of the fossils of the Pliocene period. The committee was led by Edward Forbes. Later annual reports of the British Association contained communications from the English, Scottish and Irish branches of the committee, and in 1850 Forbes submitted its first general report on British marine zoology. Ball's dredge was still in use in 1910.

In the 20th century the 'anchor-dredge' was developed to sample deep burrowing animals. It is not towed but digs in, and is released, in the manner of an anchor.

The wide variety of dredges and other benthic sampling equipment makes site comparison difficult.

Gallery

See also
 Fishing dredge

References
Anastasios Eleftheriou and  Alasdair McIntyre, 2005 Methods for the Study of Marine Benthos, Third Edition 
McIntyre, A.D., Elliot, J.M., and Ellis, D.V. 1984. Introduction: Design of sampling programmes. In: Methods for the study of marine benthos (N.A. Holme and A.D. McIntyre, eds.), pages 1–26. Blackwell Scientific, Oxford..
Forster, G. R.  1953 A New Dredge for Collecting Burrowing Animals Journal of the Marine Biological Association (1953), 32 :193-198.
Helen M. Rozwadowski, 2008 Fathoming the Ocean:The Discovery and Exploration of the Deep Sea Harvard University Press

External links

The Norman Holme Archive
  John J. Dickinson  and Andrew G. Carey, Jr.A comparison of two benthic infaunal samplers ASLO Vol 20 issue 5

Marine biology